James Dargavel Irving (1860–1933) was a Canadian business person based in Bouctouche, New Brunswick. He was the patriarch of the Irving family.

Born in 1860 in Bouctouche to immigrants from Dumfries, Scotland, James was colloquially referred to by his initials J.D.  The father of industrialist K.C. Irving, J.D. was considered a major entrepreneur in Kent County and was the owner and operator of "a sawmill, gristmill, carding mill, a general store, lumber business and three farms."

J.D. is cited as being the founder of the modern-day holding company J.D. Irving Limited within the Irving Group of Companies.   J.D. Irving Ltd grew significantly under his son, K.C., later his grandsons J.K, Art, and Jack, and their children.

See also
 J.D. Irving Limited
 K.C. Irving
 Irving Group of Companies

References

Canadian businesspeople
People from Bouctouche
1860 births
1933 deaths
Canadian people of Scottish descent